Dr. Abdul Azis Saleh (20 September 1914 – 3 April 2001), a specialist in anthropology and education, was a leader of Indonesian Scouting and served as a member of the World Scout Committee and President of the World Organization of the Scout Movement Asia-Pacific Region.

He became involved in the creation of the Gerakan Pramuka Indonesia in 1961 and was a member of the "Group of 5" mandated by President Sukarno, who took the opportunity of the absence of the Minister of Education to build a non-communist youth association. In 1970, he became Gerakan Pramuka Secretary General.

In 1978, he was awarded the 129th Bronze Wolf, the only distinction of the WOSM, awarded by the World Scout Committee for exceptional services to world Scouting.

He was also successively Minister of Health (1957–1959), Minister of Agriculture and then Minister of Industry in Indonesia.

References

External links

Recipients of the Bronze Wolf Award
1914 births
2001 deaths
World Scout Committee members
Government ministers of Indonesia
Health ministers of Indonesia
Agriculture ministers of Indonesia